Katy Lick is an unincorporated community in Harrison County, West Virginia, United States.

References 

Unincorporated communities in West Virginia
Unincorporated communities in Harrison County, West Virginia